Xu Faguang (born 17 May 1987) is a Chinese racewalking athlete who specialises in the 50 kilometres race walk. He has represented his country three times at the World Championships in Athletics (2009, 2011, 2013) with his best finish being seventh in 2011. He is also a three-time participant of the IAAF World Race Walking Team Championships, having entered in 2010, 2012 and 2016. He was a team gold medallist with China in 2010 and 2012.

He won the Chinese Universities title over 20,000 m in 2012.

Personal bests
10 kilometres race walk – 40:03 min (2009)
20 kilometres race walk – 1:20:26 (2008)
50 kilometres race walk – 3:42:20 (2011)

International competitions

References

External links



Living people
1987 births
Chinese male racewalkers
World Athletics Championships athletes for China